Mohammad Reza Nematzadeh (born 9 July 1945, in Tabriz)is an Iranian politician who was minister of industry of Iran since he was approved by the Iranian parliament on 15 August 2013 until 20 August 2017.

Early life and education
Born in Tabriz in 1945, Nematzadeh received his elementary and secondary education in Tehran and a bachelor of science degree in environmental engineering from California State Polytechnic University in 1968. He was a graduate student in industrial management at the University of California (Berkeley) but was unable to continue and returned to Iran.

Career
Nematzadeh was the minister of labour in 1980 and served as the minister of industry from 1980 to 1981, and again from 1989 to 1997. He also chaired the presidential campaign of the current Iranian President, Hassan Rouhani, which led to an election of Rouhani in June 2013. On 15 August, he was confirmed by the Majlis as minister of industry, mining and trade, receiving 199 Yes votes and 60 Nays. 24 Majlis members did not attend the session. He was announced on 26 July 2017 that he will not be in Rouhani's second cabinet.

References

1945 births
Living people
People from Tabriz
California Polytechnic State University alumni
Government ministers of Iran
Moderation and Development Party politicians
Executives of Construction Party politicians
Islamic Republican Party politicians
Iranian campaign managers